Janne Furch (1915–1992, nee Ertel) was a German screenwriter. She also acted in three films early in her career. She was married to the conductor Franz Allers.

Selected filmography
 Dear Miss Doctor (1954)
 Homesick for Germany (1954)
 Music in the Blood (1955)
 The Tour Guide of Lisbon (1956)
 My Brother Joshua (1956)
 The Beautiful Master (1956)
 Just Once a Great Lady (1957)
 The Big Chance (1957)
 The Winemaker of Langenlois (1957)
 Two Hearts in May (1958)
 Thirteen Old Donkeys (1958)
 The Csardas King (1958)
 That's No Way to Land a Man (1959)
 Kein Mann zum Heiraten (1959)
 The White Horse Inn (1960)
 My Niece Doesn't Do That (1960)
 Guitars Sound Softly Through the Night (1960)
 Robert and Bertram (1961)
 Mariandl (1961)
 Doctor Sibelius (1962)
 The Merry Widow (1962)
 The Forester's Daughter (1962)
The Curse of the Yellow Snake (1963)
 The Model Boy (1963)
 Help, My Bride Steals (1964)
 The World Revolves Around You (1964)
 In Bed by Eight (1965)
 Always Trouble with the Teachers (1968)

References

Bibliography 
 Bergfelder, Tim. International Adventures: German Popular Cinema and European Co-Productions in the 1960s. Berghahn Books, 2005.

External links 
 

1915 births
1992 deaths
Mass media people from Kiel
German women screenwriters
German film actresses
Film people from Schleswig-Holstein
20th-century German screenwriters